Iași railway station is the main railway station in Iași, and one of the oldest in Romania. It is part of the Pan-European Corridor IX.

History

Opened in 1870, the Grand Railway Station first connected Iași to Chernivtsi in Bukovina, Austria-Hungary and, after two years, to Bucharest.

In 1928-1930, two additional wings were symmetrically added to each side of the building. In 1980, a new separate building was constructed on the north side of the complex station and named Iași Nord.

The main buildings of the station have recently been restored with modern additions.-

Current operations

Passenger services
As of 2013, Iași railway station serves about 110 trains in a typical day, including domestic trains to and from a majority of Romanian cities. Additionally, international trains run to Chișinău and Ungheni, in the Republic of Moldova.

The main lines in Iași are Făurei – Tecuci – Iași and Iași – Pașcani.

Local transit
The station is served by several tram and bus lines operated by CTP Iași, the local transit operator. Bus route 50 provides direct service to the Iași International Airport, at specific times of day, correlated with flight arrivals and departures.

Distance from other railway stations

Romania
 Arad (via Oradea): 
 Bacău: 
 Baia Mare: 
 Brașov (via Buzău): 
 București: 
 Constanța: 
 Craiova: 
 Galați: 
 Oradea: 
 Suceava: 
 Timișoara (via Oradea): 
 Timișoara (via Deva):

Europe
 Belgrad (via Cluj-Napoca): 
 Berlin: 
 Budapest (via București): 
 Budapest (via Cluj-Napoca): 
 Chișinău: 
 Frankfurt am Main: 
 Kyiv (via Suceava): 
 Kyiv (via Bălți): 
 Sofia: 
 Venice: 
 Vienna:

References

External links

Trains timetable

Railway stations in Romania
Railway stations opened in 1870
Transport in Iași
Tourist attractions in Iași
Historic monuments in Iași County
Buildings and structures in Iași